Calendaring Extensions to WebDAV, or CalDAV, is an Internet standard allowing a client to access and manage calendar data along with the ability to schedule meetings with users on the same or on remote servers. It lets multiple users in different locations to share, search and synchronize calendar data. It extends the WebDAV (HTTP-based protocol for data manipulation) specification and uses the iCalendar format for the calendar data. The protocol is used by many important open-source applications.

History
The CalDAV specification was first published in 2003 as an Internet Draft submitted to the Internet Engineering Task Force (IETF) by Lisa Dusseault. In March 2007, the CalDAV specification was finished and published by the IETF as RFC 4791, authored by Cyrus Daboo (Apple),  Bernard Desruissaux (Oracle), and Lisa Dusseault (CommerceNet). CalDAV is designed for implementation by any collaborative software, client or server, that needs to maintain, access or share collections of events. It is developed as an open standard to foster interoperability between software from different vendors.

Specification
The architecture of CalDAV (partially inherited from the underlying specifications) organizes the data (events, tasks, free-busy info, notes) in directories (collections), where multiple items (resources) reside. The resources and collections can be accessed by one or more users, using standard HTTP and DAV semantics to detect conflicting changes, or to provide locking.

For access control the concept of ACLs are used, so each operation (view, edit, delete etc.) can be denied or granted per user. Therefore, the specification requires that CalDAV servers must support "WebDAV Access Control Protocol" (RFC 3744).
The calendar resources must use iCalendar format, which allows the server to understand and process the data. Parsing the iCalendar items is necessary, because the server has to support a number of calendaring-specific operations such as doing free-busy time reports and expansion of recurring events.  With this functionality, a user may synchronize their own calendar to a CalDAV server, and share it among multiple devices or with other users.  The protocol also supports non-personal calendars, such as calendars for sites or organizations.

Software

Client
The list of CalDAV clients includes:
 AgenDAV (Open Source multi-language CalDAV WebClient with AJAX interface)
 Bloben (Open Source self hosted CalDAV web client) 
 iPhone (version 3.0 or version 2.1 with Remote Calendar)
 CalDavZAP (Web-based HTML5 / JavaScript application, Open Source)
 CalDAV Tasksync for Android
 CalDAV-Sync for Android
 CalendarSync for Android
 DAVx⁵ (previously called DAVdroid) for Android (Open Source)
 EVO Collaborator for Outlook add caldav sync capability to Outlook 
 Evolution (Linux, Unix, Windows) 
 eM Client (Windows, macOS)
 gSyncit (Sync Microsoft Outlook with mobile/tablet device)
 Horde Groupware
 iCal4OL (No longer available for new customers)
 iCal/Calendar.app (Since Mac OS X Leopard !V 10.5)
 iCal Import/Export CalDAV for Android
 Mailfence CalDAV client through iCAL/vCAL
 Sunbird or Thunderbird with the Lightning extension (Linux, Windows, Unix, Mac OS X)
 OpenSync for Android
 Outlook CalDav Synchronizer (open source) adds CalDAV support to Microsoft Outlook
 vdirsyncer synchronizes calendars (and addressbooks) between two storages, e. g. CalDAV (CardDAV) server with a local folder or file.
 Windows 10, though restricted to certain providers

Server
The list of CalDAV servers includes:
 Apple Darwin Calendar Server
 Baïkal, a lightweight CalDAV and CardDAV server.
 Bedework (former UWCalendar)
 Bynari Collaboration Suite
 Chandler Server (Cosmo)
 CommuniGate Pro Since version 5.2
 Cyrus IMAP server since version 2.4.17
 DAViCal
 DPCalendar
 DavMail
 Daylite CalDAV Server
 Dingo Calendar Server
 EGroupware Since version 1.6
 EVO Mail Server
 Fabasoft Folio Cloud
 Google Calendar
 Horde Groupware
 Icewarp-E-Mail-Server Since version 8.x
 Kerio Connect
 MDaemon Email Server
 Mailfence
 mod caldav
 Nextcloud
 Open-Xchange
 Oracle Beehive
 Oracle Siebel CRM
 Oracle Communications Calendar Server
 ownCloud
 Radicale (CalDAV)
 SOGo
 SabreDAV
 Scalix
 Sun Java Calendar Server
Synology Calendar
 Synovel CollabSuite
 Xandikos
 Yahoo Calendar
 Zarafa Since la version 6.30.0
 Zimbra Since version 4.5
 sync!Egw
 Zoho CRM

See also
 Exchange ActiveSync
 Comparison of CalDAV and CardDAV implementations
 Calendar
 CardDAV
 GroupDAV, an effort to create a simplified, straightforward protocol for calendars as well as contacts.
 iCalendar
 Scheduling OSID defines a software interface abstraction for calendaring protocols
 SyncML
 vCalendar
 WebDAV

References

External links
 CalDAV Resource Site
 CalConnect, The Calendaring and Scheduling Consortium
 WebDAV Resources
 Open Calendar Sharing and Scheduling with CalDAV L. Dusseault, J. Whitehead, IEEE Internet Computing 9(2)

RFCs
  – HTTP
  – WebDAV Access Control Protocol
  – CalDAV
  – WebDAV
  – iCalendar
  – iTIP

Application layer protocols
Calendaring standards